The 2008 Colorado Republican presidential caucuses took place on February 5, 2008, with two national delegates.

Colorado chose 21 other delegates during district conventions from May 24 to June 7, 2008.

Results

See also
 2008 Colorado Democratic caucuses
 2008 Republican Party presidential primaries

References

Wyoming
2008 Colorado elections
Republican Party (United States) events in Colorado
2008 Super Tuesday
Colorado Republican primaries